Glutarimide is the organic compound with the formula (CH2)3(CO)2NH.  It is a white solid. The compound  forms upon dehydration of the amide of glutaric acid.

Glutarimide is sometimes called 2,6-piperidinedione. It is the core of a variety of drugs, including thalidomide, a medication used to treat multiple myeloma and leprosy, and cycloheximide, a potent inhibitor of protein synthesis.

References